|}

The Criterion Stakes is a Group 3 flat horse race in Great Britain open to horses aged three years or older. It is run on the July Course at Newmarket over a distance of 7 furlongs (1,408 metres), and it is scheduled to take place each year in late June or early July.

The present Criterion Stakes was established in 1978, and for a period it was classed at Listed level. 
During the eighties the race was known as the Van Geest Stakes.  It was promoted to Group 3 status in 1986.

A previous race with the same name was an important event for two-year-olds. Its winners included Ormonde (1885), Flying Fox (1898), Pretty Polly (1903) and Gay Crusader (1916).

Records
Most successful horse (2 wins):
 Libranno – 2011, 2012
 Limato - 2019, 2020

Leading jockey (3 wins):
 Richard Hughes – Trade Fair (2003), Libranno (2012), Producer (2013)

Leading trainer (4 wins):

 Richard Hannon Sr. – Rock City (1990), Libranno (2011, 2012), Producer (2013)
 John Gosden – Toussaud (1992), Hill Hopper (1994), Racer Forever (2008), Gregorian (2014)

Winners

See also
 Horse racing in Great Britain
 List of British flat horse races

References
 Paris-Turf:
 Racing Post:

 galopp-sieger.de – Criterion Stakes.
 horseracingintfed.com – International Federation of Horseracing Authorities – Criterion Stakes (2018).
 pedigreequery.com – Criterion Stakes – Newmarket.
 

Flat races in Great Britain
Newmarket Racecourse
Open mile category horse races
Recurring sporting events established in 1978
1978 establishments in England